Enallage (enallagḗ, "interchange") is one type of scheme of rhetorical  figures of speech which is used to refer to the use of tense, form, or person for a grammatically incorrect counterpart.

Form
One use of enallage is to give a sentence improper form quite deliberately. Shakespeare wrote, "‘Is there not wars? Is there not employment?’" (2nd Henry IV, I, ii) In these cases, he uses enallage to achieve parallel structure. Byron stated, "The idols are broke in the temple of Baal." Here he used the past tense form of break instead of the past participle, broken, which should have been used. In the opening lines of the Aeneid, Virgil speaks of the “walls of lofty Rome.” Daniel Mendelsohn, in The New Yorker, cites this as an example of enallage: "The poet knew what he was doing—'lofty walls' is about architecture, but 'lofty Rome' is about empire," though arguably this figure could be considered hypallage, the transposition of the natural relations of two elements in a proposition.

Another noted example is when professional prize fight manager Joe Jacobs cried, We was robbed!, after his fighter lost a decision in 1932. Through this utterance Arthur Quinn claimed Jacobs "achieved for himself linguistic immortality."

Apple's advertising slogan Think Different can be viewed as a deliberately incorrect grammatical construction.

Person
Limhi, a king in the Book of Mormon, gave an example of enallage by switching persons during one of his discourses. Limhi began his discourse by addressing his people using the second person pronouns ye and you: "O ye, my people, lift up your heads and be comforted" (Mosiah 7:18). However, later in his discourse Limhi shifted to the third person when addressing his people: "But behold, they would not hearken unto his words; but there arose contentions among them, even so much that they did shed blood among themselves" (Mosiah 7:25). One possible reason why Limhi performed this second-person to third-person pronoun shifting was to create distance between his people and their actions, allowing them to become objective observers of their own behavior.

At the conclusion of his discourse Limhi switched back to the second person: "And now, behold, the promise of the Lord is fulfilled, and ye are smitten and afflicted. But if ye will turn to the Lord with full purpose of heart, and put your trust in him, and serve him with all diligence of mind, if ye do this, he will, according to his own will and pleasure, deliver you out of bondage" (Mosiah 7:32–33). Switching back to the second-person allowed Limhi to personalize the message of deliverance to his people, allowing them to understand that even though they had committed grave errors, they could still repent and be delivered out of bondage.

References

 Holy Bible: Concordance. World Publishing Company: Cleveland.
 Cuddon, J.A., ed. The Penguin Dictionary of Literary Terms and Literary Theory. 3rd ed. Penguin Books: New York, 1991.
 
 Spendlove, Loren Blake. . Limhi’s Discourse: Proximity and Distance in Teaching. Interpreter: A Journal of Mormon Scripture 8 (2014): 1–6.

Rhetorical techniques